Vitaliy Berezovskyi (born 11 April 1984) is a football defender from Ukraine who is currently a free agent.

Playing career
Berezovskyi began playing in his hometown city of Odesa, initially with the FC Chornomorets Odesa reserve team, before moving to Dniester Ovidiopol for the 2002–03 season. In 2003, he moved to the Moldova championship to play with Sheriff Tiraspol and FC Tiraspol. In 2005, he moved back to Ukraine with FC Ros' Bila Tserkva, before having a short spell with FK Ventspils in Latvia. In 2007, he moved to FC Ihroservice Simferopol.

References

External links
 

1984 births
Living people
Ukrainian footballers
Association football defenders
Ukrainian expatriate footballers
Expatriate footballers in Moldova
Expatriate footballers in Latvia
Expatriate footballers in Belarus
Expatriate footballers in Kazakhstan
Expatriate footballers in Poland
OKS Stomil Olsztyn players
FK Ventspils players
FC Sheriff Tiraspol players
FC Chornomorets Odesa players
FC Tiraspol players
FC Dynamo Brest players
FC Ihroservice Simferopol players
FC Naftan Novopolotsk players
FC Kaisar players
FC Zirka Kropyvnytskyi players
Ukrainian expatriate sportspeople in Moldova
Ukrainian expatriate sportspeople in Belarus
Ukrainian expatriate sportspeople in Kazakhstan
Ukrainian expatriate sportspeople in Poland
FC Chornomorets-2 Odesa players
FC Dnister Ovidiopol players
FC Ros Bila Tserkva players
Sandecja Nowy Sącz players
Footballers from Odesa